Club Deportivo Tricolor Municipal de Paine, commonly referred to as Tricolor Municipal, is a professional football club based in Paine, Chile.

Kits 
 Home Kit: Red and white stripes shirt, blue shorts and blue socks. 
 Away Kit: Blue shirt, white shorts and white socks.

Honours

National 
 Tercera División (1)
1943
 Cuarta División (1)
1990

Regional 
 Regional Central (1)
1958

References

Bibliography

External 
  Tricolor Municipal on Instagram

Tricolor Municipal